Pillangó utca (lit. Butterfly street) is a station of the M2 (East-West) line of the Budapest Metro. The station was open on 2 April 1970 as part of the inaugural section of Line M2, between Deák Ferenc tér and Örs vezér tere.

References

M2 (Budapest Metro) stations
Railway stations opened in 1970